Zasap is a settlement north of Cerklje ob Krki in the Municipality of Brežice in eastern Slovenia. The western part of the runway of the Cerklje ob Krki Air Base lies in the territory of Zasap. The area is part of the traditional region of Lower Carniola. It is now included with the rest of the municipality in the Lower Sava Statistical Region.

At the end of the 19th century an Iron Age burial ground with about 50 graves was excavated in the area and finds from the graves are kept by the National Museum of Slovenia.

References

External links
Zasap on Geopedia

Populated places in the Municipality of Brežice